The Oracle Challenger Series – Houston is a professional tennis tournament played on hard courts. It is currently part of the ATP Challenger Tour and the Women's Tennis Association (WTA) 125K series. It is held annually in Houston, United States since 2018. The ATP Challenger Tour returned to Houston, Texas for the first time since 2001, with the inaugural Oracle Challenger Series Houston making its debut in November. Held on the campus of Rice University, at the new $9 million George R. Brown Tennis Complex. Houston is will  become one of just two U.S. cities to host tournaments on both the ATP World Tour and ATP Challenger Tour, with the ATP World tour tournament being the U.S. Men's Clay Court Championships. The Oracle Challenger Series – Houston is the second stop for the Oracle Challenger Series calendar. The winner of the Oracle Challenger Series earns a wild card into Indian Wells Masters.

Past finals

Men's singles

Women's singles

Men's doubles

Women's doubles

References 

 Official website

 
ATP Challenger Tour
WTA 125 tournaments
Hard court tennis tournaments in the United States
Recurring sporting events established in 2018